The  2010 Camping World Watkins Glen Grand Prix was the eighth running of the Camping World Watkins Glen Grand Prix and the ninth round of the 2010 IndyCar Series season. It took place on Sunday, July 4, 2010. The race was contested over 60 laps at the  Watkins Glen International in Watkins Glen, New York, and was televised by ABC in the United States. Will Power, driving for Team Penske, took the pole and the win. Ryan Briscoe was second and Dario Franchitti third.

Classification

Qualifying

Race 

 Please note that Will Power obtained pole position and fastest lap, with pole position gaining him two points, the fastest lap gaining him one point, and winning the race giving him the regular 50 points, totaling 53 points.

Championship standings after the race 

Drivers' Championship standings

 Note: Only the top five positions are included.

Camping World Grand Prix at the Glen
Camping World Grand Prix at the Glen
Camping World Grand Prix at the Glen
Watkins Glen Indy Grand Prix